Kaymaklı means "containing kaymak" in Turkish, kaymak being a Turkish creamy dairy product.

Kaymaklı may also refer to:
Kaymaklı Monastery, a 15th-century Armenian monastery near Trabzon, Turkey
Kaymakli Underground City, Cappadocia, Turkey
Kaimakli, a large suburb of Nicosia, northern Cyprus
Küçük Kaymaklı Türk S.K., a football team based there
Kaymaklı, İliç